Weerapon Jongjoho (born 7 February 2001) is a Thai boxer. He participated at the 2018 Summer Youth Olympics, being awarded the bronze medal in the boys' middleweight event. Johgjoho also participated at the 2021 AIBA World Boxing Championships, being awarded the bronze medal in the middleweight event. In a round, he defeated Ivan Papakin. Somjit Jongjohor, the flyweight champion of the 2008 Summer Olympics, is his uncle.

References

External links 

2001 births
Living people
Place of birth missing (living people)
Weerapon Jongjoho
Middleweight boxers
AIBA World Boxing Championships medalists
Boxers at the 2018 Summer Youth Olympics
Medalists at the 2018 Summer Youth Olympics